Fidelio A. Hungo Rodríguez (January 12, 1893 – December 5, 1980) was a Cuban infielder in the Negro leagues and the Cuban League in the 1910s and 1920s.

A native of Regla, Cuba, Hungo played in the Negro leagues for the Long Branch Cubans in 1915 and 1916. He also played several seasons in the Cuban League between 1913 and 1921 for the Almendares and Habana clubs. In 1923, Hungo played minor league baseball with the Tampa Smokers. He died in Los Angeles, California in 1980 at age 87.

References

External links
 and Seamheads

1893 births
1980 deaths
Almendares (baseball) players
Habana players
Long Branch Cubans players
Orientals players
San Francisco Park players
Tampa Smokers players
Baseball infielders
Baseball players from Havana